The Friendship And The Fear is an album by worship artist Matt Redman.

The original album was produced by Andy Piercy and recorded at various locations:
 Curtis Schwartz Studios, Surrey, England – (Engineer: Curtis Schwartz).
 Penn Farm Studios, ?, England – (Engineer: Curtis Schwartz, for "The Way of the Cross").

Track listing
 Disc - Total Time 73:17
 "There Is a Louder Shout to Come" – 5:24
 "Believer" – 4:34
 "Bowing Down" – 5:04
 "Deep Calls to Deep" – 6:32
 "Pure, Pure Heart" – 6:23
 "Knocking on the Door of Heaven" – 5:51
 "Once Again" – 6:32
 "Can I Ascend" – 5:49
 "Can We Walk Upon the Water" – 6:01
 "The Way of the Cross" – 5:00
 "I Need to Get the Fire Back" – 5:10
 "The Yoke Is Easy" – 4:39
 "The Friendship and the Fear" – 6:18

StarSong US release
For the US release although the name was the same this is almost a different
album. However the track listing is somewhat different, combining songs from the UK release and his 
earlier album, Passion For Your Name. Some believe this to be a rather uncomfortable blend of styles and prefer to UK releases as a result.

 "Believer" – 4:34
 "Knocking on the Door of Heaven" – 5:49
 "There Is a Louder Shout to Come" – 6:00
 "I Will Offer Up My Life" – 5:01
 "The Way of the Cross" – 4:57
 "It's Rising Up" – 7:19
 "Bowing Down" – 5:02
 "The Cross Has Said It All" – 3:54
 "Once Again" – 6:30
 "Friend of Sinners" – 3:09
 "Can I Ascend" – 5:51
 "The Friendship and the Fear" – 4:30
 "Better Is One Day" – 6:23

Personnel 
 Matt Redman – lead vocals, guitars
 Steve Cantellow – keyboards, additional backing vocals
 Paul Carrack – keyboards, Hammond organ, backing vocals
 Richard Causon – keyboards
 Mark Edwards – keyboards, acoustic piano, Hammond organ 
 Stuart Townend – keyboards 
 Craig Borlase – guitars
 Dan Boreham – guitars 
 Dave Clifton – guitars, mandolin
 Stuart Garrard – guitars 
 Bryn Haworth – guitars 
 Martin Smith – guitars 
 Jim Bryan – bass
 Andy Coughlin – bass
 Paul Lancaster – bass
 Dudley Phillips – bass
 Colin Brookes – drums, additional backing vocals
 Phil Crabbe – drums
 Martin Neil – drums, percussion, drum programming 
 Curtis Schwartz – drum programming, additional backing vocals
 Mike Sturgis – drums
 Andy Piercy – tambourine, additional backing vocals
 Steve Gregory – soprano saxophone
 Helen Burgess – backing vocals
 Vanessa Freeman – backing vocals 
 Kaz Lewis – backing vocals
 Esther Pratt – backing vocals
 Stephen Quashie – backing vocals
 Soul Survivor crowd – additional backing vocals

Release details
 1997, UK, Survivor Records SURCD001, Release Date ? ? 1997, CD
 1998, USA, Star Song 724382017523, Release Date 27 January 1998, CD
 2003, UK, Survivor Records SURCD092, Release Date 21 Mar 2003, CD (double CD with Intimacy)

1997 albums
Matt Redman albums
Survivor Records albums